Rovaniemen Kiekko Naiset ('Rovaniemi's Puck Women') or RoKi Naiset are an ice hockey team in the Naisten Liiga. They are the women’s representative team of Rovaniemen Kiekko, an ice hockey club in Rovaniemi, Lapland, Finland and their home is Lappi Areena.

History 
The team was founded in 2012 and quickly established itself as a perennially successful competitor in the Naisten Mestis, the second-tier women’s ice hockey league in Finland. In December 2019, RoKi earned promotion to the Lower Division of the Naisten Liiga, Finland’s premier women’s ice hockey league. The 2020–21 Naisten Liiga season was the first time the team played a full season in the league.

Season-by-season results 
This is a partial list of the last two seasons completed by RoKi Naiset.Note: Finish = Rank at end of series; GP = Games played, W = Wins (3 points), OTW = Overtime wins (2 points), OTL = Overtime losses (1 point), L = Losses, GF = Goals for, GA = Goals against, Pts = Points, Top scorer: Points (Goals+Assists)

Players and personnel

2022–23 roster 

Coaching staff and team personnel
 Head coach: Tuomas Liitola
 Assistant coach: Ville-Veikko Kykyri
 Assistant coach: Alexi Salonen
 Assistant coach: Andrei Valui
 Goaltending coach: Juha Haimakainen
 Team manager: Kari Laitila
 Equipment managers: Antti Karjalainen & Seppo Orava

Team captains 
 Arja Oja, 2014–2016
 Janina Jatkola, 2016–2019
 Ella Lahtela, 2019–20
 Jenna Pirttijärvi, 2020–21
 Emmi Mourujärvi, 2021–22
 Eveliina Ollila, 2022–

Head coaches 
 Sofia Pohjanen, 2016–2018
 Tuomas Liitola, 2018–

Notable alumni 
Years active with RoKi listed alongside players' names.
 Janina Jatkola, 2013–2019
 Sini Karjalainen, 2013–2015
 Aino Karppinen, 2013–2018 & 2020–2022
 Ines Lukkarila, 2015–2019
 Jenna Pirttijärvi, 2018–2021
 Inna Sirviö, 2014–2019
 Julia Zielińska, 2019–20

References

External links 
 Team information and statistics from Eliteprospects.com or Eurohockey.com or Hockeyarchives.info (in French)

Naisten Liiga (ice hockey) teams
Rovaniemi
2012 establishments in Finland